Raisin is a French surname. Notable people with the surname include:

 Agatha Raisin, fictional character
 Catherine Raisin (1855–1945), British geologist
 Ross Raisin (born 1979), British novelist
 Saul Raisin (born 1983), American cyclist